Woodruff County Airport  is a county-owned public-use airport in Woodruff County, Arkansas, United States. It is located four nautical miles (5 mi, 7 km) east of the central business district of Augusta, Arkansas.

This airport is included in the FAA's National Plan of Integrated Airport Systems for 2011–2015, which categorized it as a general aviation airport.

Facilities and aircraft 
Woodruff County Airport covers an area of 100 acres (40 ha) at an elevation of 200 feet (61 m) above mean sea level. It has one runway designated 9/27 with an asphalt surface measuring 3,797 by 75 feet (1,157 x 23 m). For the 12-month period ending April 30, 2008, the airport had 5,500 general aviation aircraft operations, an average of 15 per day.

References

External links 
 Woodruff County Airport (M60) at Arkansas Department of Aeronautics
 Aerial image as of 6 March 2000 from USGS The National Map

Airports in Arkansas
Transportation in Woodruff County, Arkansas
Buildings and structures in Woodruff County, Arkansas